Professor Pamela Hanrahan (born 24 May 1965) is Professor of Commercial Law and Regulation at the UNSW Business School in Sydney. She is an academic lawyer, author, and media commentator on corporate law and financial services regulation in Australia.

Early life and education 
Pamela Fay Hanrahan was born 24 May 1965 in Melbourne Australia. She was educated at Loreto Mandeville Hall and Presbyterian Ladies’ College Melbourne where she was MacFarland Scholar (Dux of School) in 1982. She matriculated to the University of Melbourne and in 1989 was graduated Bachelor of Arts (Honours) and Bachelor of Laws with Honours. She was a member of Newman College from 1983 to 1986. She graduated Master of Laws (Honors) from CWRU Law School in 1995 and Doctor of Juridical Science from Melbourne Law School in 2006.

Career 
Hanrahan began her legal career with Allens (then Arthur Robinson & Hedderwicks) in 1989. In 2004, she was appointed as an Associate Professor of the Melbourne Law School. In 2008 – 2011 she was a senior executive of the Australian Securities and Investments Commission including serving as ASIC Regional Commissioner for Queensland in 2010-11 and as a member of the ASIC Audit Committee and ASIC Technology Governance Board. In 2013-2015 she was the Registrar of Community Housing for New South Wales. In 2015, she was appointed as Professor of Commercial Law and Regulation in the UNSW Business School. In 2017 she was a member of the ASIC Enforcement Review Taskforce. In 2018 she was an adviser to the Royal Commission into Misconduct in the Banking, Superannuation and Financial Services Industry.

Boards and appointments 
Hanrahan was appointed as a non-executive director of Landcom in 2018 and Deputy Chair of Landcom in 2022.

She was elected as a member of the executive of the Business Law Section of the Law Council of Australia in 2017 and became Deputy Chair in 2021.

She was appointed as a member of the Corporate Governance Committee of the Australian Institute of Company Directors in 2019.

Publications 
Hanrahan has published numerous articles and books on Australian corporate law and financial services regulation which include:

 Securities and Financial Services Law (jointly) (10th edition 2021)  
 Corporate Governance (jointly) (2017)  
 Managed Investments Law and Practice (1999-)  
 Funds Management in Australia: Officers’ Duties and Liabilities (2009)
 Commercial Applications of Company Law (jointly) (23rd edition 2022)  
 Commercial Applications of Company Law in Malaysia (jointly) (3rd edition 2008)
 Commercial Applications of Company Law in New Zealand (jointly) (5th edition 2015)
 Commercial Applications of Company Law in Singapore (jointly) (5th edition 2015)
 Contemporary Issues in Corporate and Competition Law: Essays in Honour of Professor Robert Baxt AO (joint editor) (2018)

References 

1965 births
Living people
Australian women lawyers
Australian women academics
University of Melbourne alumni
Academic staff of the University of New South Wales
20th-century Australian lawyers
21st-century Australian lawyers
People educated at Loreto Mandeville Hall
People educated at the Presbyterian Ladies' College, Melbourne
Academics from Melbourne
Lawyers from Melbourne
Case Western Reserve University School of Law alumni